Below are the rosters for teams competing in the 2002 World Junior Ice Hockey Championships.

Group A

Head coach:  Július Šupler

Head coach:  Keith Allain

Head coach:  Bo Lennartsson

Head coach:  Jaroslav Holík

Head coach:  Vladimir Melenchuk

Group B

Head coach:  Erkka Westerlund

Head coach:  Stan Butler

Head coach:  Vladimir Plyuschev

Head coach:  Jakob Kölliker

Head coach:  Dave Henderson

References
 IIHF Official Results – Top Division

Rosters
World Junior Ice Hockey Championships rosters